Enteromius pseudotoppini is a species of ray-finned fish in the  family Cyprinidae.
It is found only in Tanzania.
Its natural habitat is rivers.
It is threatened by habitat loss.

References

Enteromius
Fish described in 1996
Taxa named by Lothar Seegers
Taxonomy articles created by Polbot